The World We Live In is the 1982 debut album from the San Francisco-based, new wave group Voice Farm, released on Optional Music. It includes "Beatnik", which AllMusic called catchy, and the album-closing Over and Over, which "masterfully blends a lyrical theme of obsession with relentless, ominous bass tones". Also included is a synthesizer driven cover of The Jaynetts' 1963 hit "Sally Go 'Round the Roses".

Track listing
"A.M. City" – 2:52
"Lost Adults" – 4:12
"Beatnik" – 3:26
"Davy's Big Battle" – 2:55
"Mama Made Me Do It" – 1:34
"Sally Go 'Round the Roses" – 3:51
"Double Garage" – 3:15
"Follow Me Home" – 2:32
"Voyeur" – 3:04
"Cheeno" – 0:54
"Over and Over" – 3:33

References

1982 debut albums
Albums produced by David Kahne